Karamanlar can refer to the following villages:

 Karamanlar, Alanya
 Karamanlar, Bolu
 Karamanlar, Dursunbey
 Karamanlar, Gündoğmuş